Henry Chester-Master Garling (7 June 1870 – 19 November 1942) was an Australian politician. Born in Camden, New South Wales, he was educated at state schools before becoming a bank officer. Having studied law, he became a solicitor in 1905. He contested the 1919 federal election as a Nationalist candidate for the Senate, but was unsuccessful. On 15 December 1921, however, when Nationalist Senator Herbert Pratten resigned to contest a by-election in the House of Representatives, Garling was appointed to replace him. He was defeated, however, at the 1922 election, leaving the Senate immediately so that Allan McDougall could continue the rest of Pratten's term. Garling returned to law, and died in 1942.

References

Nationalist Party of Australia members of the Parliament of Australia
Members of the Australian Senate for New South Wales
1870 births
1942 deaths
20th-century Australian politicians